Lassine Sinayoko (born 8 December 1999) is a Malian professional footballer who plays as a forward for  club Auxerre and the Mali national team.

Club career
Sinayoko started playing for Auxerre's reserve side in 2017. On 29 June 2019, he signed his first professional contract with the club. After the 2019–20 season in the Championnat National 3, Auxerre B finished top of Group E, and were promoted to the Championnat National 2, with Sinayoko playing a part.

On 10 April 2021, Sinayoko made his professional debut in a 4–0 Ligue 2 win over Niort.

International career 
On 16 August 2021, Sinayoko was called up to the Mali national team for the first time. He made his debut in a  0–0 FIFA World Cup qualification tie with Uganda on 6 September 2021.

Honours 
Auxerre B
 Championnat National 3: 2019–20

References

External links
 
 

1999 births
Living people
Sportspeople from Bamako
Malian footballers
Mali international footballers
Association football forwards
Entente SSG players
AJ Auxerre players
Ligue 2 players
Ligue 1 players
Championnat National 2 players
Championnat National 3 players
2021 Africa Cup of Nations players
Malian expatriate footballers
Malian expatriates in France
Expatriate footballers in France
21st-century Malian people